John Machar (1796 – February 7, 1863) was the second principal (1846–1853) of Queen's University, then known as Queen's College at Kingston.

Machar was born in Tannandice, Scotland. He was ordained as a Presbyterian minister in 1819. In 1827, he emigrated to Kingston, Upper Canada in order to become the minister at St Andrew's Presbyterian Church.

Machar was one of the original trustees of the University, and became its principal in 1846, when Thomas Liddell resigned unexpectedly. He resigned in 1853, after a term marred by financial issues.

He was the father of author Agnes Maule Machar.

References

Further reading

1796 births
1893 deaths
19th-century Presbyterian ministers
Canadian Presbyterians
Immigrants to Upper Canada
People from Angus, Scotland
Principals of Queen's University at Kingston
Scottish emigrants to pre-Confederation Ontario